HGN may refer to:
 Halogen Software, Canada
 Horizontal gaze nystagmus, a field sobriety test. 
 Hougang MRT station (MRT station abbreviation), in Singapore
 Hough Green railway station, in England
 Hyperbolic geometric network
 Mae Hong Son Airport, in Thailand